The Eastern Caribbean Currency Union (ECCU) is a development of the Organization of Eastern Caribbean States. This organization is composed of Anguilla, Antigua and Barbuda, Dominica, Grenada, Montserrat, St. Kitts and Nevis, St. Lucia, and St. Vincent and the Grenadines. It is under the supervision of the Eastern Caribbean Central Bank. The member countries use a common currency, the Eastern Caribbean dollar, which is pegged at EC$2.70 to US$1.

References

External links 
 Eastern Caribbean Central Bank
 IMF Overview of the ECCU

Economy of the Organisation of Eastern Caribbean States
International economic organizations
Organisation of Eastern Caribbean States